Phoenicoprocta haemorrhoidalis is a moth in the subfamily Arctiinae. It was described by Johan Christian Fabricius in 1775. It is found in Brazil.

References

Moths described in 1775
Euchromiina
Taxa named by Johan Christian Fabricius